Shankara Variyar was an astronomer-mathematician of the Kerala school of astronomy and mathematics. His family were employed as temple-assistants in the  temple at  near modern Ottapalam.

Mathematical lineage
He was taught mainly by Nilakantha Somayaji (1444–1544), the author of the Tantrasamgraha and Jyesthadeva (1500–1575), the author of Yuktibhāṣā. Other teachers of Shankara include Netranarayana, the patron of Nilakantha Somayaji and Chitrabhanu, the author of an astronomical treaties dated to 1530 and a small work with solutions and proofs for algebraic equations.

Works
The known works of Shankara Variyar are the following:
 Yukti-dipika - an extensive commentary in verse on Tantrasamgraha based on Yuktibhāṣā.
 Laghu-vivrti - a short commentary in prose on Tantrasamgraha.
 Kriya-kramakari - a lengthy prose commentary on Lilavati of Bhaskara II.
 An astronomical commentary dated 1529 CE.
 An astronomical handbook completed around 1554 CE.

References

 K. V. Sarma (1997), "Sankara Variar", Encyclopaedia of the History of Science, Technology, and Medicine in Non-Western Cultures edited by Helaine Selin, Springer, </ref>

Indian Hindus
Kerala school of astronomy and mathematics
Year of death unknown
Year of birth uncertain
16th-century Indian mathematicians
People from Ottapalam
Scientists from Kerala
16th-century Indian astronomers